How the West Was Won may refer to:
 How the West Was Won (film), a 1962 American Western film
 How the West Was Won (TV series), a 1970s television series loosely based on the film
 How the West Was Won (Bing Crosby album) (1959)
 How the West Was Won (Led Zeppelin album) (2003)
 How the West Was Won (Peter Perrett album) (2017)
 How the West Was Won, a 2002 album by Luni Coleone
 "How the West Was Won", a 1987 song by Laibach from Opus Dei
 "How the West Was Won", a 1996 song by the Romo band Plastic Fantastic

See also
 How the West Was Fun, a 1994 TV movie starring Mary-Kate and Ashley Olsen
 How the West Was One (disambiguation)
 "How the West Was Won and Where It Got Us", a 1997 song by R.E.M.